Operation Dove ("Unternehmen Taube" in German) also sometimes known as Operation Pigeon, was an Abwehr sanctioned mission devised in early 1940. The plan envisioned the transport of IRA Chief of Staff Seán Russell to Ireland, and on the arrival of Frank Ryan in Berlin three days before the launch of the operation, it was also decided to transport him during the operation.

Russell's arrival and activities in Germany
Seán Russell had arrived in Berlin on 5 May 1940, four days after arriving in Genoa from the United States. Russell was informed of Operation Mainau, the plan to parachute Dr. Hermann Görtz into Ireland. Russell was asked to brief Görtz on Ireland before his departure that night, but missed his takeoff from the Fritzlar airfield near Kassel.

By 20 May, Russell had begun training with Abwehr in the use of the latest German explosive ordnance. This training was conducted at the Abwehr training school/lab in Berlin-Tegel, which specialised in the design of explosives as everyday objects. Russell also visited the training area for the Brandenburg Regiment, the 'Quenzgut,' where he observed trainees and instructors working with sabotage materials in a field environment. As he had had received explosives training, his return to Ireland with a definite sabotage objective was planned by German Intelligence. His total training time with German Intelligence lasted over three months.

Immediate context

While Görtz had landed successfully, the capture of the German agents from Operation Lobster I did not prevent Abwehr chief Wilhelm Canaris from allowing the transport of Russell to continue.  Both Russell and Frank Ryan departed aboard  from Wilhelmshaven on 8 August — the mission was dubbed Operation Dove.

Russell became ill during the journey and complained of stomach pains. U-65 was not staffed with a doctor and he died on 14 August  short of Galway. He was buried at sea and the mission aborted.

Footnotes

Further information and sources
Mark M. Hull, Irish Secrets. German Espionage in Wartime Ireland 1939-1945, Dublin:Irish Academic Press, 2003,

Notable Abwehr operations involving Ireland
Operation Lobster
Operation Lobster I
Operation Seagull
Operation Seagull I
Operation Seagull II
Operation Whale
Operation Osprey
Operation Sea Eagle
Plan Kathleen
Operation Green (Ireland)
Operation Mainau
Operation Innkeeper

See also
The Emergency
IRA Abwehr World War II - Main article on IRA Nazi links

Dove
Dove (Ireland), Operation
Dove (Ireland), Operation
Dove
Western European theatre of World War II